Yervant Aghaton (1860 - 1935), was a prominent Armenian political figure, agronomist, publisher, writer, and one of the founding members of the Armenian General Benevolent Union (AGBU). He was the son of Krikor Aghaton.

Life 
Yervant Aghaton was born in Constantinople in Haskoy. He studied first at the local Nersisyan primary school, then Nubar-Shahnazaryan colleges. He then continued his education at the prestigious Robert College. In 1877 he was sent off to Paris to study at the Grignon agricultural college, after graduation, he returned to Constantinople. After the Hamidian Massacres he fled Turkey to continue his university education in Paris. From there he went to Bulgaria and then to Egypt, where in 1920's wrote several books. He wrote Hayastani Verashinutyune (Rebuilding Armenia) (1924), "Donations and testament" (1925), "Armenia in a village of farmers exemplar program" (1925), "AGBU birth and history", etc. and in 1931 he published his memoirs.

References

1860 births
1935 deaths
Agronomists
19th-century Armenian writers
Armenians from the Ottoman Empire
Writers from Istanbul
Turkish publishers (people)
20th-century Armenian writers
Survivors of the Hamidian massacres
19th-century writers from the Ottoman Empire